The SMART (System for the Mechanical Analysis and Retrieval of Text) Information Retrieval System is an information retrieval system developed at Cornell University in the 1960s. Many important concepts in information retrieval were developed as part of research on the SMART system, including the vector space model, relevance feedback, and Rocchio classification.

Gerard Salton led the group that developed SMART.  Other contributors included Mike Lesk.

The SMART system also provides a set of corpora, queries and reference rankings, taken from different subjects, notably
 ADI: publications from information science reviews
 Computer science
 Cranfield collection: publications from aeronautic reviews
 Forensic science: library science
 MEDLARS collection: publications from medical reviews
 Time magazine collection: archives of the generalist review Time in 1963

To the legacy of the SMART system belongs the so-called SMART triple notation, a mnemonic scheme for denoting tf-idf weighting variants in the vector space model. The mnemonic for representing a combination of weights takes the form ddd.qqq, where the first three letters represents the term weighting of the collection document vector and the second three letters represents the term weighting for the query document vector. For example, ltc.lnn represents the ltc weighting applied to a collection document and the lnn weighting applied to a query document.

The following tables establish the SMART notation:

The gray letters in the first, fifth, and ninth columns are the scheme used by Salton and Buckley in their 1988 paper. The bold letters in the second, sixth, and tenth columns are the scheme used in experiments reported thereafter.

References

External links 
 Software and test collections (FTP at Cornell University)
 Interactive SMART tutorial

Discontinued software
Search engine software